This is a list of volcanoes in Armenia.

Gallery

References 

Armenia
 
Volcanoes